The name Kenna was used for three tropical cyclones in the Eastern Pacific Ocean.

 Tropical Storm Kenna (1984) – remained well out at sea
 Hurricane Kenna (1990) – a Category 1 hurricane that did not affect land
 Hurricane Kenna (2002) – a Category 5 hurricane that made landfall near San Blas, Mexico

The name Kenna was retired in the spring of 2003, and was replaced with Karina for the 2008 season.

Pacific hurricane set index articles